Thekkedesom  is a village in the Palakad district, state of Kerala, India.  It forms a part of the Nalleppilly gram panchayat, which is itself subordinate to the Chittur taluk.

Demographics
 India census, Thekkedesom had a population of 12,871 with 6,293 males and 6,578 females.

References

Thekkedsom